James Fitzharris nicknamed Skin-the-Goat (4 October 1833 – 7 September 1910) was a member of the Dublin, Ireland-based Invincibles.

Biography
Born at Ferns, County Wexford, where his father was an employee at the Sinnott estate, he later became an Irish republican. 

When working as a cab driver, he earned his nickname when he found a goat eating the horse hair in his horses' collar. Fitzharris killed and skinned the goat on the spot, using the hide to cover his knees when he drove his cab.

Ultimately, he served as getaway driver during the assassination of Permanent Under Secretary Thomas Henry Burke and Lord Frederick Cavendish in Phoenix Park. He was later tried and found not guilty of the murders but in a retrial in May 1883, was convicted of conspiracy and accessory to murder and sentenced to penal servitude for life. He was released from prison in 1899 and visited the United States until he was deported back to Ireland in 1900.

He is mentioned in the Irish folk song, "Monto (Take Her Up to Monto)", written by George Desmond Hodnett and popularised by The Dubliners.     He is also mentioned in James Joyce's Ulysses (pp. 133-134, 1934 ed.).  

FitzHarris died on 7 September 1910, in the South Dublin Union workhouse where he had been living in penury. He is buried in Glasnevin Cemetery. His death certificate noted that he was married but little is known of his wife or family.

References

External links
 The Invincibles and the Phoenix Park killings, theirishstory.com

1843 births
1910 deaths
1882 crimes in the United Kingdom
18th-century Irish people
19th-century Irish people
Members of the Irish Republican Brotherhood
Irish rebels
People deported from the United States
People from County Wexford
Place of death missing